The Cessna Citation V is a business jet built by Cessna.
A stretched version of the Citation S/II, a Model 560 prototype flew in August 1987, it was certified on December 9, 1988, and delivered from April 1989;  were delivered until 2011.

The upgraded Citation Ultra was announced in September 1993, the Citation Encore upgraded with PW535 turbofans was announced in 1998, before the improved Encore+. Its US military designation is UC-35 as an executive transport and OT-47B as a drug interdiction reconnaissance aircraft.

Design and development

The Citation V (Model 560) is a development of the Citation S/II, retaining the supercritical airfoil and swept wing roots of that aircraft, but with a  fuselage stretch and recontoured interior for increased passenger space. Maximum seating capacity is eleven, consisting of two pilots, eight passengers in the cabin, and one additional passenger or crew member in the belted lavatory. Cessna also replaced the fluid deicing system of the S/II with improved pneumatic deicing boots for decreased weight and easier maintenance, and the horizontal stabilizer span was increased slightly to compensate for the increased engine thrust. The Citation V was also the first Citation with an electronic flight instrument system (EFIS) offered as standard equipment, albeit only on the captain's side.

A preproduction prototype flew in early 1986 and the first engineering prototype made its maiden flight in August 1987. The Citation V was announced at the NBAA convention later that year, Federal Aviation Administration (FAA)  certification was granted on December 9, 1988 and 262 were delivered between April 1989 and mid 1994. The Citation V was the best-selling business jet on the market during its production run.

The Citation V was followed in 1994 by the Citation Ultra with slightly more thrust, the Citation Encore in 2001 then the Citation Encore+ in 2007 through early 2010.

Citation Ultra

The upgraded Citation V Ultra was announced in September 1993 and FAA certification was granted in June 1994. It features extensively redesigned JT15D-5D engines with new compressors, high-pressure turbines, and a one-piece solid machined fan disks, increasing thrust to  while reducing fuel consumption and weight; consequently, the Ultra was the first straight winged Citation with sufficient performance to exceed its critical Mach number in level flight. The captain's side EFIS of the Citation V was upgraded to a full Honeywell Primus 1000 glass cockpit for both pilots. Deliveries amounted to 279.
The Ultra was named Flying magazine's "Best Business Jet" of 1994 and it was produced until 1999. Both the Citation V and Ultra hold 5814 pounds of fuel.

By 2018, Citation V/Ultra were priced at $1.1–1.6 million.

Citation Encore/Encore+

The Citation Ultra Encore was announced at the 1998 NBAA convention, upgraded with new PW535 engines, plus trailing link main undercarriage, more fuel capacity, updated interior and improved systems. Its maximum cruise altitude is FL 450. Deliveries amounted to 168. The Encore was certified in April 2000 with first delivery in late September 2000.

The upgraded Citation Encore+ was offered from 2007 through early 2010. Deliveries amounted to 65. It was certified by the FAA in December 2006.

The Encore+ adds FADEC and Rockwell Collins Pro Line 21 avionics with a center MFD and both side PFDs.
It has a  range at  TAS, the CJ3+ speed but slower than a CJ4.
It can fly with one pilot but most are operated with two.

Light checkups are due every 150 h, basic maintenance at 300 h or 24 months, comprehensive inspections at 1,200 h or 36 months, engine hot section inspections at 2,500 h with 5,000 h overhauls and simple inspections at 10,000 and 12,000 h and at 10,000 and 15,000 landings.

An Encore+ is valued at $3.4–3.8 million in December 2018 and it benefits from Textron Aviation's support.
The CJ3 has better fuel efficiency and runway performance but a shorter cabin, the Learjet 45XR cruises faster and hauls more but needs longer runways and burns more fuel, while the CJ4 has better payload/range but is more expensive.
The later Model 560 variants are the fastest and farthest flying jets with the type certificate of the original Citation 500.

Softer landing trailing link main landing gear reduced fuel tank capacity to 5,440 pounds, 360 pounds less than the Ultra's, but it has more range. The wheel track was narrowed 3.7 feet for better ground tracking and easier crosswind landing.

The wing leading edge is de-iced by Bleed air. Boundary layer energizers and a stall fence improve stall characteristics. Pressurization is digitally controlled and  brake modulation is improved. Redesigned interior fittings and passenger seats provide more seated headroom. Passenger service units provide more even airflow and temperature control.

MTOW increases by 330 pounds to 16,630 pounds, to carry five passengers with full fuel, lengthening takeoff from the 3,180 feet needed by the Ultra. The improved PW535 high altitude thrust allow the Encore to climb faster and cruise higher.

Military designations

The UC-35A is the United States Army designation and UC-35C is the United States Marine Corps designation for the Citation Ultra, which replaced older versions of the C-12 Huron.

Another version of the Model 560 is the OT-47B Tracker, five of which were purchased by the Department of Defense for use in drug interdiction reconnaissance operations, based at Maxwell Air Force Base. The OT-47B utilizes AN/APG-66 fire control radar and the WF-360TL imaging system. The OT-47Bs have been operated on loan to the Colombian Air Force and Peruvian Navy.

The UC-35B is the Army designation and UC-35D is the Marine Corps designation for the Citation Encore.

Variants

 Model 560 
 Development of Citation S/II certificated on December 9, 1988, with  JT15D-5A engines,  maximum takeoff weight (MTOW),  usable fuel, and EFIS on captain's side only.
 Model 560 
 Improved Citation V with  JT15D-5D engines,  MTOW, and full EFIS instruments. 
 Model 560 Citation Encore
 Improved Citation Ultra certificated on April 26, 2000, with  PW535A engines,  MTOW,  usable fuel, and improved trailing-link landing gear.
 Model 560 Citation Encore+
 Improved Encore certificated on December 14, 2006, with PW535B engines, includes FADEC and a redesigned avionics.
 UC-35A
 U.S. Army and U.S Air Force transport version of the V Ultra.
 UC-35B
 U.S. Army transport version of the Encore.
 UC-35C
 U.S. Marine Corps transport version of the V Ultra. Two aircraft.
 UC-35D
 U.S. Marine Corps transport version of the Encore. Eleven aircraft.
 OT-47B Tracker
 Five V Ultras purchased by United States Department of Defense in 1995 for drug interdiction reconnaissance, equipped with AN/APG-66 radar and WF-360TL thermal imaging systems.

Operators

Civilian operators
The aircraft is operated by private individuals, companies, fractionals, charter operators and aircraft management companies.

Military operators
 
 Colombian Air Force
 
 Pakistan Army — 1 × Citation V 
 
 United States Army
 United States Marine Corps

 Peruvian Army
 
 Spanish Air and Space Force 3 for aerophotography. Based in Getafe AFB

Specifications (Cessna Citation Ultra)

See also

References

Notes

Citations

Bibliography
Hoyle, Craig. "World Air Forces Directory". Flight International, Vol. 182, No. 5370, 11–17 December 2012. pp. 40–64. ISSN 0015-3710.
Lambert, Mark. (editor) Jane's All the World's Aircraft 1993–94. Coulsdon, UK: Jane's Data Division, 1993. .
 .
 Taylor, Michael J.H. (editor) Brassey's World Aircraft & Systems Directory 1999/2000. London: Brassey's, 1999. .

External links

 Cessna Citation family home page
 

1980s United States business aircraft
Citation V
Twinjets
Low-wing aircraft
Citation 005
Aircraft first flown in 1987